Ivaylo Yanachkov (born 31 August 1986) is a Bulgarian football goalkeeper who plays for Ægir.

Career
In January 2014, Yanachkov signed with Slivnishki Geroy. In June 2017, Yanachkov moved from Botev Vratsa to Lokomotiv Sofia.

In January 2018, Yanachkov joined North-West Third League side Spartak Pleven but was released at the end of the season.

References

External links
 

Living people
1986 births
Bulgarian footballers
Bulgarian expatriate footballers
PFC Rodopa Smolyan players
PFC Rilski Sportist Samokov players
FC Chavdar Etropole players
FC Montana players
FC Botev Vratsa players
FC Oborishte players
FC Lokomotiv 1929 Sofia players
PFC Spartak Pleven players
OFC Pirin Blagoevgrad players
Knattspyrnufélagið Ægir players
First Professional Football League (Bulgaria) players
Second Professional Football League (Bulgaria) players
Association football goalkeepers
Bulgarian expatriate sportspeople in Iceland
Expatriate footballers in Iceland
Þróttur Vogum players